ISO 3166-2:TH is the entry for Thailand in ISO 3166-2, part of the ISO 3166 standard published by the International Organization for Standardization (ISO), which defines codes for the names of the principal subdivisions (e.g., provinces or states) of all countries coded in ISO 3166-1.

Currently for Thailand, ISO 3166-2 codes are defined for 1 metropolitan administration, 1 special administrative city, and 76 provinces. The metropolitan administration Bangkok is the capital of the country and has special status equal to the provinces. The special administrative city Pattaya is a self-governing city in Chonburi province.

Each code consists of two parts, separated by a hyphen. The second part is two digits, except Pattaya which uses a letter:
 leading digits 1, 2, 6, 7: Central Thailand
 leading digits 3, 4: Northeastern Thailand
 leading digit 5: Northern Thailand
 leading digits 8, 9: Southern Thailand
 S: Pattaya

ISO 3166-2:TH follows the Thai standard TIS 1099, which in turn follows codes assigned by the Ministry of Interior.

Current codes
Subdivision names are listed as in the ISO 3166-2 standard published by the ISO 3166 Maintenance Agency (ISO 3166/MA).

Click on the button in the header to sort each column.

See also
 Subdivisions of Thailand
 FIPS region codes of Thailand

References

External links
 ISO Online Browsing Platform: TH
 Provinces of Thailand, Statoids.com

2:TH
ISO 3166-2
Thailand geography-related lists